The Queen's Birthday Honours 2011 for Australia were announced on 13 June 2011.

† indicates an award given posthumously.

Order of Australia

Companion (AC)

General Division

Officer (AO)

General Division

Member (AM)

General Division

Military Division

Medal (OAM)

General Division

Military Division

Public Service Medal (PSM)

Australian Police Medal (APM)

Australian Fire Service Medal (AFSM)

Ambulance Service Medal (ASM)

Emergency Services Medal (ESM)

Medal for Gallantry (MG)

Commendation for Gallantry

Meritorious Unit Citation

Distinguished Service Cross (DSC)

Distinguished Service Medal (DSM)

Commendation for Distinguished Service

Conspicuous Service Cross (CSC)

Conspicuous Service Medal (CSM)

References
Queen's Birthday 2011 Honours Lists, Governor-General of Australia: The Australian Honours Secretariat

2011 awards
Orders, decorations, and medals of Australia
2011 awards in Australia